Kly is a municipality and village in Mělník District in the Central Bohemian Region of the Czech Republic. It has about 1,600 inhabitants.

Administrative parts
Villages of Dolní Vinice, Hoření Vinice, Krauzovna, Lom, Větrušice and Záboří are administrative parts of Kly.

Geography
It lies in a flat landscape in the Central Elbe Table. The Elbe River flows along the western municipal border. Part of the Úpor – Černínovsko Nature Reserve is located in the municipal territory.

History
The first written mention of Kly is from 1323. The municipality was heavily damaged by the 2002 European floods.

Sights
The main landmark is the Church of the Nativity of the Virgin Mary in Záhoří. It is a Neorenaissance church from 1884, which replaced the old Gothic church.

In the centre of Kly is the Chapel of Saint Wenceslaus. It dates from 1886.

References

External links

Villages in Mělník District